Ross is an unincorporated community in Calumet Township, Lake County, Indiana.

History
Ross was named for William Ross, a pioneer settler. A post office was established at Ross in 1857, and remained in operation until it was discontinued in 1914.

Geography

References

Unincorporated communities in Lake County, Indiana
Unincorporated communities in Indiana
1857 establishments in Indiana